Mitch Cahalane (born 5 May 1989) is an Australian professional rugby league footballer who most recently played as a prop for Halifax in the Kingstone Press Championship. 

Cahalane has played for the Mount Pritchard Mounties in the NSW Cup and was previously in the system of the Penrith Panthers.

References

External links
Halifax profile

1989 births
Living people
Rugby league props
Halifax R.L.F.C. players
Mount Pritchard Mounties players